The Pizhma is a river in the Komi Republic in Russia, an arm of the Pechora. The Pizhma flows southeast out of the Yamozero Lake, turns east and then north and joins the Pechora  at Ust-Tsilma, where the Tsilma also joins the Pechora. The river freezes up in late October or early November and stays icebound until late April or early May. The Pizhma is navigable along its lower reaches.

References

Rivers of the Komi Republic